Modoc Mission Church and Cemetery is a historic mission church and cemetery in Miami, Oklahoma.

It was built in 1892 and added to the National Register of Historic Places in 1980.  The listing included four contributing buildings.

References

External links
 

Churches in Oklahoma
Churches on the National Register of Historic Places in Oklahoma
Churches completed in 1892
Buildings and structures in Ottawa County, Oklahoma
National Register of Historic Places in Ottawa County, Oklahoma
Cemeteries on the National Register of Historic Places in Oklahoma